This is list of Irish language exonyms for places outside Ireland. The tables contain both exonym and endonym of places around the world. The exonyms in Irish and the endonyms in their regional language.

Algeria

Belgium

Bosnia and Herzegovina

Canada

China

Croatia

Cyprus

Czech Republic

Denmark

Egypt

France

Germany

Great Britain

Greece

Iceland

India

Indonesia

Israel

Italy

Libya

Lithuania

Moldova

Myanmar

Palestine

Poland

Portugal

Romania

Russia

Serbia

South Korea

Spain

Sudan

Sweden

Switzerland

Syria

Tunisia

Ukraine

United Arab Emirates

United States

Vietnam

References
téarma.ie – Téarma – the National Terminology Database for Irish, developed by Fiontar (Dublin City University) in collaboration with An Coiste Téarmaíochta (Foras na Gaeilge)

See also
List of European exonyms

Irish language
Irish
Celtic language-related lists